Boxing Kangaroo is an 1895 German short black-and-white silent documentary film, directed and produced by Max Skladanowsky, which features a Kangaroo boxing against a man against a white background at the Circus Busch.

The "groundbreaking production", was, according to WildFilmHistory, "a huge success", which, "despite being intended for entertainment rather than as a scientific behaviour study", "revealed animal actions in a way that had never been seen before", and, "exposed the potential for future films concerning wildlife and natural history".

References

External links 

 
 

1895 films
1890s German films
German black-and-white films
German boxing films
Films of the German Empire
German short documentary films
German silent short films
Films directed by Max Skladanowsky
Articles containing video clips
Films about kangaroos and wallabies
1890s short documentary films